The genus Gallotia are the lacertids (wall lizards) of the Canary Islands. This genus consists of a group that has been evolving there ever since the first islands emerged from the sea over 20 million years ago. The endemic species and subspecies of this group have a number of characteristics that make them quite special within their family (Lacertidae); their only close relatives are the sandrunner lizards (Psammodromus) of the western Mediterranean region. Gallotia are characteristic for eating significant quantities of plants, and several lineages are often presented as classic examples for insular gigantism. However, a find of an even larger Gallotia species from the early Miocene of mainland Europe casts doubt on this assumption. Instead the ancestor of all modern Gallotia species of the Canary islands was probably already very large but carnivorous (Černaňský et al., 2016).

Systematics and biogeography
This genus can be broadly divided into two groups - lineages originating from the colonization of the earliest Canary Islands of Lanzarote, Fuerteventura and Gran Canaria, probably between 10-20 million years ago, and a lineage that colonised the younger western islands probably less than 10 million years ago (Cox et al., 2010). Both lineages contain large and small species.

MtDNA analyses indicate that Lanzarote and Fuerteventura were colonized first and this led to the small body-sized G. atlantica which is present today (Cox et al., 2010). Gran Canaria was the next island to have been colonized from Lanzarote/Fuerteventura, giving rise to the large body-sized species, G. stehlini (Cox et al., 2010).  Finally, the clade that colonized the younger western islands was likely to have originated from Lanzarote/Fuerteventura. This western island clade diverged into two groups, all of which colonized Tenerife, La Palma, La Gomera and El Hierro, leading to 1) a medium-bodied (e.g., G. caesaris from El Hierro) and 2) a large bodied "giant" species (e.g., G. simonyi from El Hierro) on each of these islands (note that G. intermedia from Tenerife belongs to the "giant" group, but present-day individuals are not that large). The giant species now exist, at best, in small relict populations, while G. auritae may be extinct on La Palma. (These patterns are based on analyses of mtDNA.) It is possible that remains of extinct giant forms will eventually be discovered on Fuerteventura & Lanzarote.

Prehistoric remains were assigned to the taxa G. goliath and G. maxima, the former supposedly occurring on several islands, the latter only on Tenerife. It was eventually determined, however, that G. maxima is a junior synonym of G. goliath, and that the latter was very close to G. simonyi; supposed G. goliath specimens from El Hierro, La Gomera, and La Palma are probably just extremely large individuals of, respectively, G. simonyi, G. bravoana, and G. auaritae (Barahona et al. 2000). However, a mummified giant specimen from Tenerife yielded ancient DNA remains, and by analysis of this, it was concluded that G. goliath is a valid species that probably was restricted to Tenerife, and apparently was closer to G. intermedia than to G. simonyi (Maca-Meyer et al. 2003).

Basal group
Gallotia atlantica - Atlantic lizard
Gallotia atlantica atlantica
Gallotia atlantica mahoratae
Gallotia stehlini - Gran Canaria giant lizard

Western clade
Large species
Gallotia simonyi - Simony's lizard
Gallotia simonyi simonyi - Roque Chico de Salmor giant lizard, extinct (c.1930s)
Gallotia simonyi machadoi - El Hierro giant lizard
Gallotia bravoana - La Gomera giant lizard, formerly G. (simonyi) gomerana and G. simonyi bravoana (Miras & Pérez-Mellado 2005a)
Gallotia auaritae - La Palma giant lizard
Gallotia goliath - Tenerife giant lizard, subfossil; includes G. maxima
Gallotia intermedia - Tenerife speckled lizard
Small species
Gallotia caesaris - Boettger's lizard
Gallotia caesaris caesaris
Gallotia caesaris gomerae
Gallotia galloti - Tenerife lizard or Western Canaries lizard
Gallotia galloti eisentrauti
Gallotia galloti galloti
Gallotia galloti insulanagae
Gallotia galloti palmae

References
 Barahona, F.; Evans, S. E.; Mateo, J.A.; García-Márquez, M. & López-Jurado, L.F. (2000): Endemism, gigantism and extinction in island lizards: the genus Gallotia on the Canary Islands. J. Zool. 250(3): 373-388.  (HTML abstract)
 Černaňský A.; Klembara J.; Smith K.T. (2016): Fossil lizard from central Europe resolves the origin of large body size and herbivory in giant Canary Island lacertids Zool. J. Linn. Soc., 167 (4) https://doi.org/10.1111/zoj.12340
 Cox, S. C.; Carranza S.;  Brown R. P. (2010): Divergence times and colonization of the Canary Islands by Gallotia lizards. Molecular Phylogenetics & Evolution 56: 747-757. 
 European Environment Agency (2006) European Nature Information System (EUNIS): Gallotia. Downloaded on 18 May 2006.
 Filson, R.P. (2000): Island Biogeography and Evolution: Solving a Phylogenetic Puzzle Using Molecular Genetics. Downloaded on 11 May 2006.
 Maca-Meyer, N.; Carranza, S.; Rando, J.C.; Arnold, E.N. & Cabrera, V.M. (2003): Status and relationships of the extinct giant Canary Island lizard Gallotia goliath (Reptilia: Lacertidae), assessed using ancient mtDNA from its mummified remains. Biol. J. Linn. Soc. 80(4): 659–670.  (HTML abstract)
  Database entry includes a range map and a brief justification of why this species is listed as critically endangered
  Database entry includes a range map and justification for why this species is critically endangered
  Database entry includes a range map and justification for why this species is critically endangered
  Database entry includes a range map and justification for why this species is critically endangered

Footnotes

 
Reptiles of the Canary Islands
Lizard genera
Taxa named by George Albert Boulenger